Diamonds & Rhinestones: The Greatest Hits Collection is a compilation album by American country music artist Dolly Parton. It was released by RCA Records and Legacy Recordings on November 18, 2022. 

The album includes Parton's collaborations with Kenny Rogers, Loretta Lynn and Tammy Wynette, and Swedish dance duo Galantis. The album also includes songs featured in Parton's films, including "9 to 5" from the 1980 movie by the same name, "Tennessee Homesick Blues" from Rhinestone, and "Red Shoes" from Dumplin'.

Track listing

Charts

Release history

References

External links
 

2022 greatest hits albums
Dolly Parton compilation albums
RCA Records compilation albums
Legacy Recordings compilation albums